Casa Rinconada is an Ancestral Puebloan archaeological site located atop a ridge adjacent to a small rincon across from Pueblo Bonito in Chaco Culture National Historical Park, northwestern New Mexico, United States.

It is an isolated great kiva (out of four in Chaco Canyon) with all the typical elements of great kivas: a masonry firebox, an inner bench, four roof-supporting large seating pits, masonry vaults, and 34 niches, divided into two sizes, encircling the kiva. There is also an unusual 39 foot (12 m) long underground passage, perhaps used in the ceremonies to allow performers sudden entry thus surprising the audience. It was dug out of the sandstone and shale that compose the ridge on which the kiva sits.

Casa Rinconada was excavated in 1930-31 by archaeologists Vivian and Reiter and the University of New Mexico/School of American Research field schools. It was reconstructed in part by Vivian in 1933, while Richter of the National Park Service worked on capping outer walls in 1955.

Casa Rinconada is accessible through the Canyon Loop Drive and 1/2-mile (800 m) trail (round trip) off the Drive.

References

Bibliography

External links
 Casa Rinconada, a Photo Gallery
 
 
 

Archaeological sites in New Mexico
Chaco Culture National Historical Park
Ancestral Puebloans
Historic district contributing properties in New Mexico
National Register of Historic Places in San Juan County, New Mexico
National Register of Historic Places in McKinley County, New Mexico
Archaeological sites on the National Register of Historic Places in New Mexico